The Central Park Five is a two-act American opera composed by Anthony Davis with libretto by Richard Wesley. It premiered on June 15, 2019, at the Long Beach Opera Company in California. The premiere was directed by Andreas Mitisek and conducted by Leslie Dunner. Davis was awarded the Pulitzer Prize for Music for the opera on May 4, 2020. An earlier, shorter version, titled Five, was premiered in Newark, New Jersey, in 2016 by the Trilogy Company. A staged concert production has been announced by New York City Opera; the date has not been set.

Summary
The opera is based on the 1989 incident in which a woman was raped and beaten and eight other people injured in New York's Central Park. Five African-American and Hispanic teenagers were convicted of assault and other charges; they served years in prison but were ultimately exonerated. The opera's large cast includes the five teenagers; five of their parents; Matias Reyes, the serial rapist ultimately proven to be the actual perpetrator; the prosecutor; a generic detective referred to as "The Masque"; and even Donald Trump, then a New York real estate developer, who published multiple full page newspaper ads demanding "Bring back the death penalty!"

Roles

Reaction
Mark Swed of the Los Angeles Times said the premiere production offered "musical excellence, with a strong cast, an orchestra that could cook and viscerally stunning conducting from Leslie Dunner". He added that the acting provided "moments of intense drama" and the "supercharged" score created "tension, terror, dismay and, in the most revealing moments, tenderness and hope".

Gordon Williams, writing for Opera Wire, called it "an incredibly effective presentation" of "a powerful work that shines a spotlight on an important event", describing it an ensemble piece with a powerful libretto and a strong cast.

Accolades
The Pulitzer Prize committee cited the work as "a courageous operatic work, marked by powerful vocal writing and sensitive orchestration, that skillfully transforms a notorious example of contemporary injustice into something empathetic and hopeful".

Composer Davis commented, "I'm excited, thrilled and honored that this work has been recognized this way," adding "it’s exciting for me that you can create political work that has an impact and speak to issues in our society. I’ve done my career creating political works, and I never thought I would ever get a Pulitzer."

References

Pulitzer Prize for Music-winning works
Operas
2019 operas
English-language operas
Operas by Anthony Davis
Operas based on real people
Operas set in the United States
Operas set in the 20th century
Cultural depictions of Donald Trump
Central Park